Hoploscopa aurantiacalis is a moth in the family Crambidae. It is found on Java.

References

Moths described in 1895
Hoploscopini